Long in the Tooth may refer to:

 Long in the Tooth (Billy Joe Shaver album), 2014
 Long in the Tooth (Primitive Race EP), 2015
 "Long in the Tooth" (Justified), a 2010 episode of the TV series Justified